Teletoon Retro was a Canadian specialty channel that was owned by Corus Entertainment that was based on the Teletoon programming block. The service was dedicated to broadcasting classic animated television programs as well as some live-action series.

Along with its French-language sister channel Télétoon Rétro, it was available in over nine million Canadian households as of 2013; together it had the most subscribers among the digital Canadian specialty channels.

Teletoon Retro was shut down on September 1, 2015, with Cartoon Network inheriting the network's CRTC license, and some of its channel spaces.

History
Teletoon Retro began as a programming block on Teletoon. On November 24, 2000, Teletoon Canada was given approval by the Canadian Radio-television and Telecommunications Commission (CRTC) to launch a national English language category 2 specialty channel named Teletoon Retro. The channel never made it to air.

Plans to launch the channel arose again in 2005, when on October 25, Teletoon Canada was given approval again to launch Teletoon Retro. The channel was launched at 6:00 PM EST on October 1, 2007 across all major television providers with its very first program being The Bugs Bunny and Tweety Show. To coincide with the channel's launch, Teletoon briefly relaunched the Retro programming block. A French language counterpart, titled Télétoon Rétro, which had been given approval to be launched at the same time as Teletoon Retro, was launched on September 4, 2008.

On February 4, 2013, the channel underwent a refresh with new graphics and bumpers created by John Lee, retiring the "Television sets" era from 2009 to 2013. In addition, the channel also underwent a new logo, and the male announcer (still used on its parent network) was discontinued and replaced with a female announcer. 

On March 4, 2013, Corus Entertainment announced that it would acquire Astral Media's 50% ownership interest in Teletoon Canada (owner of Teletoon, Télétoon, Teletoon Retro, Télétoon Rétro, and Cartoon Network), along with several other properties. The purchase was in relation to Bell Media's pending takeover of Astral (which had earlier been rejected by the CRTC in October 2012, but was restructured to allow the sale of certain Astral Media properties in order to allow the purchase to clear regulatory hurdles). Corus's purchase was cleared by the Competition Bureau two weeks later on March 18.

On December 20, 2013, the CRTC approved Corus's full ownership of Teletoon Canada and it was purchased by Corus on January 1, 2014. The channel continues to be owned by Teletoon Canada, now wholly owned by Corus Entertainment under its Corus Kids division.

On March 1, 2014, a high definition simulcast of the channel was launched. The only two providers to carry it were Cogeco and Bell Fibe TV. Shaw Direct, SaskTel, Bell MTS, and Telus Optik TV never launched the feed in time.

In August 2015, Teletoon Retro's website announced that the channel would be shut down effective September 1, 2015; some of its programming was moved to the main Teletoon network. On some providers, Teletoon Retro was replaced by either Disney Channel or Cartoon Network. The transition was legally structured so that Cartoon Network would cease to exist as a separately-licensed service as of September 1, 2015, and henceforth operate under Teletoon Retro's category B license instead. The final program to air on this channel before the changeover was the Dexter's Laboratory Season 2 episode "Hunger Strikes".

More than eight years later after its demise, Corus announced on February 21, 2023 it will rebrand Teletoon into a third iteration of Cartoon Network while the existing channel in what was formerly Teletoon Retro will be relaunched as a Canadian version of Boomerang on March 27, 2023.

Former programming
Teletoon Retro primarily aired classic animated programming; its CRTC license specified that programming had to have been produced at least 10 years prior. While primarily devoted to animation, its CRTC license allowed as much as 10% of its programming to be live action; as such, it also aired several live-action series, such as Batman, Fraggle Rock, and Mighty Morphin' Power Rangers.

 The 13 Ghosts of Scooby-Doo (2007–09)
 Adventures of Tintin (2011–15)
 The All-New Scooby and Scrappy-Doo Show (2007–09)
 Alvin and the Chipmunks (2008–15)
 Animaniacs (2014–15)
 Babar (2013–15)
 The Banana Splits (2007–11)
 Batman (2012–14)
 Batman: The Animated Series (2008–12)
 Beetlejuice (2009–13)
 Bobby's World (2012–15)
 The Bugs Bunny and Tweety Show (2007–13, 2014–15)
 Captain Caveman and the Teen Angels (2007–10)
 Casper the Friendly Ghost (2008–12, 2015)
  The Care Bears Family (2012–2015)
 Cow and Chicken (2014–15)
 Dexter's Laboratory (2014–15)
 Fantastic Four (2008–11)
 Fat Albert and the Cosby Kids (2007–10)
 Felix the Cat (2011–13)
 The Flintstones (2007–15)
 For Better or For Worse (2011–13)
 Fraggle Rock (2008–13)
 Garfield and Friends (2011–15)
 G.I. Joe: A Real American Hero (2008–12)
 Goosebumps (2012–15)
 The Gumby Show (2015)
 He-Man and the Masters of the Universe (2010–15)
 Hoppity Hooper (2007–11, 2013–15)
 The Huckleberry Hound Show (2008–12)
 Inspector Gadget (2008–15)
 Jem and the Holograms (2011–13)
 The Jetsons (2007–13; 2014–15)
 Johnny Bravo (2014–15)
 Josie and the Pussycats (2008–12)
 King of the Hill (2011)
 Laff-A-Lympics (2007–09)
 The Little Lulu Show (2011–15)
 Looney Tunes (2011–15)
 The Merrie Melodies Show (2007–10, 2014)
 The Mighty Hercules (2012–15)
 Mighty Morphin Power Rangers (2010–12)
 My Pet Monster (2012–15)
 Ned's Newt (2012–14)
 The New Adventures of Batman (2008–09, 2014)
 The New Adventures of Superman (2008–10)
 The New Scooby-Doo Movies (2011–13)
 The Pink Panther Show (2009–13)
 Popeye the Sailor (2010–14)
 The Porky Pig Show (2007–11)
 The Quick Draw McGraw Show (2008–11)
 The Raccoons (2007–09, 2012)
 The Real Ghostbusters (2008–11, 2013–15)
 ReBoot (2008–12)
 The Road Runner Show (2007–10)
 Rocket Robin Hood (2007–09)
 The Rocky and Bullwinkle Show (2007–11, 2013–15)
 Scooby-Doo, Where Are You! (2007–11)
 The Secret World of Santa Claus (2013–15)
 She-Ra: Princess of Power (2010–14)
 The Smoggies (2011–13, 2014–15)
 The Smurfs (2008–15)
 Spider-Man (2008–12)
 Super Friends (2008–10)
 Teenage Mutant Ninja Turtles (2012–15)
 ThunderCats (2009–12)
 Tiny Toon Adventures (2013–15)
 The Tom and Jerry Comedy Show (2011–13)
 The Tom and Jerry Show (2012–13)
 Tom and Jerry Kids (2012–15)
 Top Cat (2007–09, 2013)
 The Transformers (2008–12)
 Wait Till Your Father Gets Home (2007–13, 2014–15)
 The Woody Woodpecker Show (2007–15)
 The Yogi Bear Show (2007–11)

See also
 Comedy Gold
 DejaView

References

Retro
Former Corus Entertainment networks
Television channels and stations established in 2007
Television channels and stations disestablished in 2015
Digital cable television networks in Canada
Children's television networks in Canada
Defunct television networks in Canada
English-language television stations in Canada
2007 establishments in Canada
2015 disestablishments in Canada
Classic television networks